SK Olympic Handball Gymnasium is an indoor sporting arena located at the Olympic Park in Bangi-dong, Songpa-gu, Seoul, South Korea. The arena was built from September 1984 to April 1986.

History
It was known as the Olympic Fencing Gymnasium or Olympic Gymnasium No. 2 prior to 2011. The arena hosted the fencing and fencing part of the modern pentathlon events at the 1988 Summer Olympics. It was renamed as such to host the SK Handball Korea League.

Notable events
Besides holding fencing at the 1988 Olympics, the arena also hosts concerts by Korean as well as international artists.
 Megadeth
 Scorpions
 Unbreakable Tour (Backstreet Boys Tour)
 It was the one of the venues for Avril Lavigne's Bonez Tour on March 23, 2005

2008–2009
 SS501: SS501 Showcase with Triple S – November 15, 2008
 Super Junior: 1st Asia Tour – "Super Show" – February 22, 23 and 24, 2008 and 3, January 4, 2009 (encore shows)
 Wonder Girls: The 1st Wonder Concert – March 28, 2009
 Super Junior – 2nd Asia Tour – "Super Show 2" – July 17, 18 and 19, 2009
 Park Hyo-shin: Park Hyo-shin's Gift – October 17, 18 and 19, 2009 – to celebrate the 10th anniversary of his debut.
 Girls' Generation: 1st Asia Tour – "Into the New World" – December 19, 20, 2009, and February 27, 28, 2010 (encore shows)

2010–2012
 19th Seoul Music Awards – February 3, 2010
 Tom Jones: Tom Jones in Seoul – March 2010 (two shows) – first concerts in Korea in 27 years.
 B1A4: 1st BABA B1A4 Concert – December 8 and 9, 2012 – The first solo concert
 CN Blue: 2012 CN Blue Live: Blue Night in Seoul – December 15 and 16 – fourth concert in Seoul

2013
 22nd Seoul Music Awards – January 31, 2013

2014
 B1A4: 2014 B1A4 Concert The Class – February 15 and 16, 2014
 2NE1: All or Nothing World Tour – March 1 and 2 – sixth and seventh concert in Seoul as part of their second world tour
 B.A.P: B.A.P Live on Earth 2014 Continent Tour – March 8 and 9 – first and second stop in Seoul as a part of their second world tour
 Block B: Blockbuster Remastering – November 22 and 23, 2014

2015
 BTS: The Most Beautiful Moment in Life On Stage Tour – November 27, 28 and 29

2016
 Seventeen: 'LIKE SEVENTEEN – Boys Wish' ENCORE CONCERT – February 13 and 14
 B.A.P: B.A.P Live on Earth 2016 World Tour – February 20 and 21 – first and second stop in Seoul as a part of their third world tour
 Got7: Fly Tour – April 29 and 30
 IU: 24 Steps: One, Two, Three, Four – December 3 and 4

2017
 BtoB: 3rd Concert 'BTOB Time' – January 21 and 22
 AOMG  Follow The Movement concert – February 11 and 12
 Twice: Twice 1st Tour: Twiceland The Opening – February 17, 18 and 19
 2PM: Concert '6 Nights' – February 24, 25 and 26
 Sechs Kies: YellowKies Day – July 15
 Kim Jong-hyun: INSPIRED –  December 9 and 10

2018
 Apink: 4th Concert 'Pink Space'  – January 12 and 13
 One Ok Rock: Ambitions Asiatour - February 2
 NU'EST W: 1st Concert 'Double You' – March 16, 17 and 18
 Shinhwa: Shinhwa Twenty Fanparty 'All Your Dreams' – March 24 and 25
 Red Velvet: 2nd Concert 'Redmare' – August 4 and 5
 Mamamoo: 2018 Mamamoo Concert 4 Seasons S/S – August 18 and 19
 Monsta X: The Connect World Tour in Seoul (Encore) – August 25 and 26
 Chvrches: Love is Dead Tour - August 27
 GFriend: 1st Concert 'Season Of GFriend' : Encore – September 8 and 9
 Shinhwa: Heart Tour in Seoul – October 6 and 7

2019
 Apink: 5th Concert 'Pink Collection' – January 5 and 6
 Lee Tae-min: T1001101 – 15, 16, and March 17
 Day6: 1st World Tour 'Youth'  [Encore] – March 30 and 31
 Park Ji-hoon: Fancon 1st Asia Tour – December 21 and 22

2020
 Taeyeon: The UNSEEN – January 17, 18 and 19

2021
 The Boyz: THE BOYZ FAN CON : THE B-ZONE – December 3, 4 and 5
 Woodz: THE INVICIBLE CITY – December 11 and 12

2022
 Got7: 2022 Fancon Homecoming with IGot7 – May 21 and 22
 Universe: UNI-KON – July 2 and 3
 Aespa: 2022 aespa Fan Meeting: MY SYNK. aespa – July 30
 Itzy: Checkmate World Tour – August 6 and 7
 Lee Jun-ho: 2022 Fan-Con <Before Midnight> – August 12, 13 and 14
 Monsta X: 2022 No Limit Tour in Seoul – September 2, 3 and 4
 Enhypen: 2022 Manifesto World Tour – September 17 and 18
 Kep1er: 2022 Kep1er Fanmeeting <Kep1anet> – October 10
 Loona: Loonatheworld Tour – October 15 and 16

2023

 DKZ: 2023 Fancon Welcome to DTU – January 14 and 15
 (G)I-dle: Neverland 3rd Fan Meeting: DEAR. NƎVƎRLAND – January 28 and 29

References

External links
 Olympic Park official website

Olympic Handball Gymnasium
Sports venues in Seoul
Olympic fencing venues
Olympic modern pentathlon venues
Indoor arenas in South Korea
Venues of the 1988 Summer Olympics
Badminton venues
Sports venues completed in 1986
Olympic Park, Seoul
Venues of the 1986 Asian Games
Handball venues in South Korea
Music venues in Seoul